The Assistant Secretary of State for Diplomatic Security is the head of the Bureau of Diplomatic Security in the United States Department of State. The Assistant Secretary of State for Diplomatic Security reports to the Under Secretary of State for Management.

Gentry O. Smith was confirmed as the Assistant Secretary of State for Diplomatic Security on August 9, 2021.

Assistant Secretaries of State for Diplomatic Security, 1987—present

References

External links
 Official website
 Profile from State Department Historian

 
Bureau of Diplomatic Security